Nedrick Young (March 23, 1914 – September 16, 1968), also known by the pseudonym Nathan E. Douglas, was an American actor and screenwriter often blacklisted during the 1950s and 1960s for refusing to confirm or deny membership of the Communist Party before the House Committee on Un-American Activities (HCUA). He is credited with writing the screenplay for Jailhouse Rock in 1957, which starred Elvis Presley.

Young was born in Philadelphia. In addition to screenwriting, he also took acting roles in various feature-length films during the period 1943–1966.

Recognition 
The Defiant Ones received an Oscar for the "best screenplay written directly for the screen" in 1958. For the same film, Young and co-writer Harold Jacob Smith won a 1959 Edgar Award for Best Motion Picture Screenplay, from the Mystery Writers of America. Inherit the Wind was also nominated for, but did not win, an Academy Award in 1960. The same year he and others brought a law suit against the Motion Picture Association (MPAA) for thirteen years of blacklisting. The suit was not successful.

Filmography
Actor

1943: Bombs Over Burma - Slim Jenkins
1943: Dead Men Walk - Dr. David Bentley
1943: Ladies' Day - Tony D'Angelo
1946: Gay Blades - Gary Lester
1946: The Devil's Playground - Curly Evans
1947: Unexpected Guest - Ralph Baxter
1948: The Swordsman - Bruce Glowan
1948: The Gallant Blade - Sergeant Martine
1949: Calamity Jane and Sam Bass - Parsons (uncredited)
1949: Border Incident - Happy (uncredited)
1950: Gun Crazy - Dave Allister
1950: Love That Brute - Rocky (uncredited)
1950: A Lady Without Passport - Harry Nordell
1951: Inside Straight - Accountant (uncredited)
1952: Retreat, Hell! - Sgt. Novak (credited: Ned Young)
1952: Aladdin and His Lamp - Hassan
1952: Springfield Rifle - Sgt. Poole (uncredited)
1952: The Iron Mistress - Henri Contrecourt
1953: She's Back on Broadway - Rafferty
1953: Captain Scarlett - Pierre DuCloux
1953: House of Wax - Leon Averill (uncredited)
1953: So This Is Love - Harry Corbett (uncredited)
1953: Crime Wave - Gat Morgan
1953: The Eddie Cantor Story - Jack (uncredited)
1958: The Defiant Ones - Prison Guard in Truck (uncredited)
1958: Terror in a Texas Town - John Crale
1966: Seconds - Henry Bushman (final film role)

Screenplay
1957: Jailhouse Rock
1958: The Defiant Ones
1960: Inherit the Wind
1968: Shadow on the Land

Personal life and death

He was married to actress Elizabeth MacRae.

Young died from a heart attack at the age of 54.

References

External links

1958 Academy Awards
Four Word Film Review: Nedrick Young
Time Out Filmography: Nedrick Young
Trailer for The Defiant One, documentary about Nedrick Young and the Hollywood blacklist

1914 births
1968 deaths
20th-century American male actors
20th-century American male writers
20th-century American screenwriters
20th-century pseudonymous writers
American male film actors
American male screenwriters
Best Original Screenplay Academy Award winners
Edgar Award winners
Hollywood blacklist
Male actors from Philadelphia
Screenwriters from Pennsylvania
Writers from Philadelphia